This is a list of singles which topped the Irish Singles Chart in 1968.

Prior to 1992, the Irish singles chart was compiled from trade shipments from the labels to record stores, rather than on consumer sales. The chart release day changed from Thursday to Saturday at the beginning of February.

See also
1968 in music
Irish Singles Chart
List of artists who reached number one in Ireland

1968 in Irish music
1968 record charts
1968